is a Japanese manga series written by Kyoichi Nanatsuki and illustrated by Night Owl. It has been serialized in Square Enix's seinen manga magazine Young Gangan since May 2010.

Publication
The Arms Peddler is written by Kyoichi Nanatsuki and illustrated by Night Owl. The series began in Square Enix's seinen manga magazine Young Gangan on May 7, 2010. The series went on hiatus in 2012 and resumed publication in 2014. Its most recent chapter was published in February 2017. Square Enix has collected its chapters into individual tankōbon volumes. The first volume was released on November 25, 2010. As of July 25, 2015, seven volumes have been released.

The series is licensed in France by Ki-oon and in Italy by J-Pop.

Volume list

References

External links
The Arms Peddler official website at Young Gangan 

Dark fantasy anime and manga
Gangan Comics manga
Seinen manga